Predrag Pavlović (born 19 June 1986) is a Serbian professional footballer who plays as a midfielder for Trayal Kruševac.

Club career
Born in Kruševac, Pavlović made his first football steps at his hometown club Napredak. He would join the youth system of Partizan in 2002, becoming a member of their promising generation, consisting of Nebojša Marinković, Milan Smiljanić and Borko Veselinović, among others. In order to get senior team experience, Pavlović was sent on loan to his parent club Napredak in the 2004–05 season. He returned to Partizan in the summer of 2005, being assigned to their satellite club Teleoptik, before eventually going back on loan to Napredak in January 2006.

In the summer of 2006, Pavlović signed a permanent contract with Napredak, before the club got promoted to the Serbian SuperLiga in 2007. He had a breakthrough season in 2007–08, scoring eight goals in 30 league appearances. After failing to complete his move to Dutch side NEC Nijmegen in August 2008, Pavlović spent two more seasons at Napredak, but struggled to recover his old form.

In the summer of 2010, Pavlović moved abroad to Hungary and signed with Debrecen. He made two cup appearances for the first team, but also played for their reserve team in the Nemzeti Bajnokság II, before being released near the end of the year. In January 2011, Pavlović returned to his homeland, having a six-month stint with Metalac Gornji Milanovac.

On 12 July 2011, Pavlović signed a four-year contract with OFK Beograd. He retired from professional football in October 2013, at the age of 27, due to a long history of injury problems. However, Pavlović came out of retirement in February of the following year by signing with Novi Pazar.

In January 2016, Pavlović moved abroad for the second time and joined Lithuanian side Sūduva Marijampolė. He played one season for the club, helping them reach the national cup final. In January 2017, Pavlović returned to his homeland and joined Mladost Lučani. He would make 108 appearances and score 20 goals across all competitions over the next three and a half seasons.

International career
Pavlović represented Serbia and Montenegro at the 2005 UEFA Under-19 Championship in Northern Ireland. He played the full 90 minutes in all of his team's four games, as they were eliminated by England in the semi-final. Already capped for the Serbia national under-21 team, Pavlović made one appearance at the 2007 UEFA Under-21 Championship, which was hosted in the Netherlands, winning the silver medal.

Pavlović was also a member of the team that represented Serbia at the 2008 Summer Olympics in Beijing, but failed to make an appearance. He previously played in two friendlies against China U23.

Career statistics

Honours

Club
Sūduva Marijampolė
 Lithuanian Cup: Runner-up 2016
Mladost Lučani
 Serbian Cup: Runner-up 2017–18

International
Serbia
 UEFA Under-21 Championship: Runner-up 2007

Notes

References

External links
 HLSZ profile
 
 Lietuvos Futbolas profile
 
 

A Lyga players
Association football midfielders
Debreceni VSC players
Expatriate footballers in Hungary
Expatriate footballers in Lithuania
FK Metalac Gornji Milanovac players
FK Mladost Lučani players
FK Napredak Kruševac players
FK Novi Pazar players
FK Partizan players
FK Sūduva Marijampolė players
FK Teleoptik players
Footballers at the 2008 Summer Olympics
Nemzeti Bajnokság II players
OFK Beograd players
Olympic footballers of Serbia
Second League of Serbia and Montenegro players
Serbia and Montenegro footballers
Serbia under-21 international footballers
Serbian expatriate footballers
Serbian expatriate sportspeople in Hungary
Serbian expatriate sportspeople in Lithuania
Serbian First League players
Serbian footballers
Serbian SuperLiga players
Sportspeople from Kruševac
1986 births
Living people